Elfen Lied is an anime series adapted from the manga of the same title by Lynn Okamoto. Produced by Arms Corporation and directed by Mamoru Kanbe, it premiered on TV Tokyo's AT-X satellite channel on 25 July 2004 and concluded on 17 October 2004. The series spanned 13 episodes and was followed by a single original video animation (OVA) on 21 April 2005. The OVA episode, referred to as episode 10.5, depicts events occurring somewhere within the timespan of episode eleven of the series. The series is based around the efforts of humanity to quarantine and eradicate the diclonius, a species of mutant humans with horns.  It focuses on "Lucy", who escapes her holding facility and is believed to be the first diclonius, and on two teenagers, Kohta and Yuka, whom Lucy encounters in the Japanese city of Kamakura.

Elfen Lied is licensed for English language releases by ADV Films for North America and by Madman Entertainment for Australia and New Zealand. ADV Films UK division aired the English dub of the series in the United Kingdom on Propeller TV as part of Anime Network's launch, uncensored and uncut. ADV released the series across four Region 1 DVD volumes, with the first volume released 17 May 2005. A box set, containing the entire series, was subsequently released 28 November 2006 in both North America and Europe to Region 2 DVD, and in Australia by Madman Entertainment on 4 April 2007. ADV did not include the OVA episode in the box set, instead releasing it as a standalone volume in 2006. The OVA was relesased by ADV Films in 2006. It was not released with the ADV series box set in 2006, nor was it dubbed into English at that time.  On September 3, 2013, Distributor Section23 Films released a Blu-ray and DVD set of the series, which included the never-before released OVA with an English dub.  However certain key characters have different voices (notably Lucy / Nyu).

The opening theme is "Lilium" by Kumiko Noma. The ending theme is "Be Your Girl" by Chieko Kawabe.

Episodes
The words "Elfen Lied" are in German, and all episodes have alternate titles in the language.  The English translations of the episode names, however, are taken from the Japanese names for the episodes.  The German titles do not translate exactly to those of the Japanese titles, except in some cases. The German episode names are included in the titles during the episodes, and "DAS ENDE" (lit. "The End") is shown in German at the end of the last episode. Translations of the original German titles are given.

TV series

OVA
Chronologically, the OVA special fits between episodes 10 and 11.  Amongst other topics, it explains how Kurama was able to capture Lucy and why she doesn't kill him whenever she encounters him.

References

External links
Official anime website 
Official ADV website (US distributor)
Official Madman website (Australian distributor)

Episodes
Elfen Lied